Amenábar is a Spanish-language surname. Notable people with the surname include:

Alejandro Amenábar (born 1972), Spanish-Chilean film director, screenwriter, and composer
Cecilia Amenábar (born 1971), Chilean model and actress

Spanish-language surnames